Reinisch is a German surname. Notable people with the surname include:

Franz Reinisch (1903–1942), Austrian Roman Catholic priest
June Reinisch (born 1943), American psychologist
Rica Reinisch (born 1965), East German swimmer
Walter Reinisch (born 1963), Austrian gastroenterologist and expert in inflammatory bowel diseases

German-language surnames
Surnames from given names